Bonelli's warbler can refer to either of two bird species, formerly regarded as conspecific:

 Western Bonelli's warbler, Phylloscopus bonelli
 Eastern Bonelli's warbler, Phylloscopus orientalis